Banī Saba' is a sub-district located in the Shar'ab as-Salam District, Taiz Governorate, Yemen. Banī Saba' had a population of 3,192 according to the 2004 census.

Villages
Al-lawiah Al-suflaa(lower Al-lawiah) village.
Al-lawiah Al'ulya(upper Al-lawiah) village.

References

Sub-districts in Shar'ab as-Salam District